Gamal Abdel Hamid (born 24 November 1957) is an Egyptian football coach and retired footballer who played as a attacking midfielder.

Career
Abdel Hamid played for the Egypt national football team at the 1990 FIFA World Cup group stage. He was also joint top-scorer at the 1988 African Cup of Nations, with 2 goals.

Honours

International
 Africa Cup of Nations for Egypt 1986
 All Africa Games Gold Medal 1987
 Africa Cup of Nations top scorer (Morocco 1988)
 Scored 3 goals for Egypt in African cups

Club
Ahly
 5 Egyptian League titles
 4 Egyptian Cup titles
 1 CAF Champions League title

Zamalek
 4 Egyptian League titles
 1 Egyptian Cup title
 2 CAF Champions League titles
 1 Afro-Asian Club Championship title for 1987

Individual
 Africa Cup Of Nations Top Scorer 1988
 Egyptian League Top Scorer 1987–88
 Captain of Egypt in 1990 FIFA World Cup
 Scored 101 goals in Egyptian league
 Scored 18 Goals in African Club Cups (16 For Zamalek & 2 For Ahly)

References

External links

1957 births
Living people
Zamalek SC players
Al Ahly SC players
Egyptian footballers
Egypt international footballers
Egyptian football managers
1990 FIFA World Cup players
1986 African Cup of Nations players
1988 African Cup of Nations players
1992 African Cup of Nations players
Africa Cup of Nations-winning players
Egyptian Premier League players
Association football midfielders
Al-Hazm FC managers
Al-Taawoun FC managers
Saudi First Division League managers
Expatriate football managers in Saudi Arabia
Egyptian expatriate sportspeople in Saudi Arabia